John Fendall Pleasants is an American entrepreneur and business executive who has led a number of digital media and technology companies over the last two decades.

Early life and education

John Pleasants was born on August 19, 1965 in Wilmington, Delaware. After receiving his bachelor's degree at Yale University in 1987, Pleasants obtained an M.B.A. from Harvard Business School in 1993.

Career

From 1988-1991, Pleasants occupied a position as sales and marketing executive for Hygiene Industries. Afterward, Pleasants spent three years as the brand manager for PepsiCo/Frito-Lay from 1995–1998, and then began a career with CitySearch, which became Ticketmaster Online CitySearch and ultimately Ticketmaster. Pleasants took Ticketmaster Online CitySearch public in September 1998, and subsequently served as Ticketmaster's CEO from 1999 to 2005. From 2005-2007 he ran Revolution Health and then entered the gaming industry as COO of Electronic Arts in 2008. Pleasants then left to be CEO of Playdom, a social gaming company that sold to Disney for $563 million in 2010. Pleasants also had success in helping to bring Disney Interactive from significant losses to material profits, most notably with the launch of the title Disney Infinity. After leaving Disney in 2013, Pleasants was recruited by Samsung Telecommunications America, LLC as Executive Vice President (EVP) of Media Solutions and he led their mobile content strategy through the summer of 2016.

Since August 2016, Pleasants has been the CEO of a smart kitchen startup, Brava Home, a company working on an intelligent oven. In November of 2019, Brava was acquired by The Middleby Corporation, a leading foodservice equipment company.  Pleasants serves on numerous boards, including M&M Media, Inc., the maker of TREBEL Music mobile media distribution platform.

Awards and recognition

References

Living people
1965 births
21st-century American businesspeople
Harvard Business School alumni
Yale University alumni